Louvre Indonesia is an Indonesian professional basketball team based in Surabaya, East Java. Founded in 2019 as Louvre Surabaya, the team made its debut in the 2023 season of the ASEAN Basketball League. Home games of Louvre are played at the Hi-Test Arena.

The club was founded by former national team player Denny Sumargo and initially played in the Indonesian Basketball League (IBL). In the 2021 season, they reached the league semi-finals. For the 2023 season, after their application was rejected, they entered the ABL in 2023, becoming the fourth team from Indonesia to play in the league. Louvre's head coach was the Filipino Gino Enriquez in Singapore series, the American Brian Rowsom in Batam series and Filipino Jomar Tierra in Malaysia and Vietnam series.

Season by season

Current roster

This is the lineup of the Louvre for the 2023 ABL season.

Coaches
  Gino Enriquez (2023)
  Brian Rowsom (2023)
  Jomar G Tierra (2023)

References 

Basketball teams in Indonesia
Basketball teams established in 2019
Sport in Surabaya
ASEAN Basketball League teams
2019 establishments in Indonesia